This page details football records in Uruguay.

Most successful clubs overall

Football in Uruguay
Uruguay